Hayes Township is a township in McPherson County, Kansas, in the United States.

Hayes Township was organized in 1876.

References

Townships in McPherson County, Kansas
Townships in Kansas
Unincorporated communities in Kansas
1876 establishments in Kansas
Populated places established in 1876